Mario Cardullo is an American inventor who received the first patent for a passive, read-write Radio-frequency identification. He is a 1957 graduate of the Polytechnic Institute of Brooklyn, now known as the New York University Tandon School of Engineering. He earned his doctorate degree from the George Mason University.

References

George Mason University alumni
Polytechnic Institute of New York University alumni
Living people
Year of birth missing (living people)